Sizwe Petrus Yende (born 29 August 1977 in Daggakraal) is a South African journalist and the author of Eerie Assignment. He is City Presss chief correspondent in Mpumalanga. Yende is one of South Africa's influential investigative journalists, focused on the eastern province of Mpumalanga.

His Eerie Assignment memoir details his journalistic journey in the province of Mpumalanga while uncovering corruption under constant intimidations in a province that has become notorious for politically motivated assassinations.

References

1977 births
Living people
South African journalists